Tyler Redenbach (born September 25, 1984) is a Canadian professional ice hockey centre who is currently playing for Oji Eagles in the Asia League Ice Hockey (AL). Redenbach was selected 77th overall by the Phoenix Coyotes in the 2003 NHL Entry Draft.

Career
Prior to playing in Europe, Redenbach had played 155 regular-season games in the American Hockey League for the Providence Bruins, San Antonio Rampage, and Grand Rapids Griffins.

Following the 2010–11 SM-liiga season, Redenbach signed a two-year contract with the Swiss EHC Olten. However his contract was terminated early  and he signed with Helsingin IFK a day later in January 2012.

On February 15, 2015, during the 2014–15 season in the Liiga with Lahti Pelicans, Redenbach was released from his contract due to financial pressures and signed from the remainder of the campaign with Swiss club, HC Davos of the National League A.

In the 2015–16 season, Redenbach belatedly signed a one-year deal in the Czech Extraliga with HC Pardubice on October 11, 2015.

Career statistics

Awards and honours

References

External links

1984 births
Living people
Arizona Coyotes draft picks
Arizona Sundogs players
HC Davos players
Grand Rapids Griffins players
HIFK (ice hockey) players
Lahti Pelicans players
Lethbridge Hurricanes players
HC Oceláři Třinec players
Odense Bulldogs players
EHC Olten players
HC Dynamo Pardubice players
HC Bílí Tygři Liberec players
Oji Eagles players
Phoenix RoadRunners players
Prince George Cougars players
Providence Bruins players
San Antonio Rampage players
SaiPa players
Swift Current Broncos players
Tappara players
Canadian expatriate ice hockey players in the Czech Republic
Canadian expatriate ice hockey players in Denmark
Canadian expatriate ice hockey players in Finland
Canadian expatriate ice hockey players in Switzerland
Canadian ice hockey centres
Canadian expatriate ice hockey players in the United States
Sportspeople from Melville, Saskatchewan
Ice hockey people from Saskatchewan
Canadian expatriate ice hockey players in Japan